The Elkhorn Slough National Estuarine Research Reserve is a nature reserve that is located at 1700 Elkhorn Road in Watsonville, California. The Elkhorn Slough is established as a part of the National Oceanic and Atmospheric Administration and is being managed as the Elkhorn Slough Ecological Reserve through the California Department of Fish and Wildlife.

Description
The mission of the  Elkhorn Slough National Estuarine Research Reserve is to promote the environmental education, research, and protection of ecosystems found in Elkhorn Slough salt marsh along with the surrounding watershed. There are programs hosted that work towards conserving and protecting the wildlife and habitats in Elkhorn Slough, as part of the National Estaurine Research Reserve system.

Recreational and Educational Activities 

The visitor center features exhibits and five miles (8 km) of trails that offer a diverse variety of plants and animals to see. This reserve also serves as a spot for kayaking and birding as well, where visitors can be surrounded by seals, fish, sea otters, and marshes. The Elkhorn Slough also contains various species of leopard sharks, birds, and fish that are considered to be threatened habitats. Visitors can observe these forms of wildlife in the watershed while learning more about these rare estaurine communities.

References

External links

Elkhorn Slough National Estuarine Research Reserve (ESNERR) - official website operated by the Elkhorn Slough Foundation 
Elkhorn Slough National Estuarine Research Reserve at the California Department of Fish and Wildlife
Elkhorn Slough National Estuarine Research Reserve at the National Estuarine Research Reserve System

National Estuarine Research Reserves of the United States
Nature centers in California
Nature reserves in California
Protected areas of Monterey County, California
Estuaries of California
Monterey Bay
Landforms of Monterey County, California
California Department of Fish and Wildlife areas